The Coney Island Derby was an American Thoroughbred horse race run annually between 1880 and 1888 at Sheepshead Bay Race Track in Sheepshead Bay, Brooklyn, New York. Open to three-year-old horses, it was contested at a mile and a half (12 furlongs) on dirt.

In 1881, future Hall of Fame inductee Hindoo won both the Coney Island Derby and the Kentucky Derby. That feat would be accomplished again in 1885 by the gelding Joe Cotton.

Records
Speed record:
 2:37 flat, Runnymede (1882)

Most wins by a jockey:
 4 - Jim McLaughlin (1881, 1882, 1885, 1887)

Most wins by a trainer:
 3 - James G. Rowe Sr. (1881, 1882, 1888)

Most wins by an owner:
 3 - Dwyer Brothers Stable (1881, 1882, 1887)

Winners

References

Flat horse races for three-year-olds
Open middle distance horse races
Discontinued horse races in New York City
Sheepshead Bay Race Track
Recurring sporting events established in 1880
Recurring sporting events disestablished in 1888